Aşağı Layısqı (also, Aşağı Layski, Ashaga-Laiski, Ashaga-Layski, and Ashagy-Layski) is a village and municipality in the Shaki Rayon of Azerbaijan.  It has a population of 1,223.

References 

Populated places in Shaki District